Mikael Pernfors was the defending champion but did not participate that year.

Andre Agassi defeated Jason Stoltenberg 6–4, 6–4 in the final.

Seeds
The top eight seeds receive a bye into the second round.

Draw

Finals

Top half

Section 1

Section 2

Bottom half

Section 3

Section 4

External links
Singles Draw

Singles